Günther Victor, Prince of Schwarzburg (21 August 1852 – 16 April 1925) was the final sovereign prince of Schwarzburg-Rudolstadt and Schwarzburg-Sondershausen.

Biography
He was born in Rudolstadt the son of Prince Adolf of Schwarzburg-Rudolstadt (1801–1875) and his wife Princess Mathilde of Schönburg-Waldenburg (1826–1914). His mother Princess Mathilde was the daughter of Otto Victor, Prince of Schönburg-Waldenburg (1785–1861) and Princess Thekla of Schwarzburg-Rudolstadt (1795–1861) a cousin of Prince Günther's father.

Following the death of his father on 1 July 1875 Prince Günther became the heir presumptive to the principality of Schwarzburg-Rudolstadt. Following the death of his first cousin once removed Prince Georg on 19 January 1890 Prince Günther succeeded him as sovereign prince of Schwarzburg-Rudolstadt.

With the death of Prince Leopold of Schwarzburg-Sondershausen on 20 April 1906 Prince Günther then became heir presumptive to the other Schwarzburg principality. The death of the prince of Schwarzburg-Sondershausen, Karl Günther on 28 March 1909 united the two Schwarzburg principalities under Prince Günther in a personal union. This was the first time the two principalities had been united under the same ruler since the 16th century when the Sondershausen and Rudolstadt lines had been formed. Following his succession in Sondershausen Prince Günther dropped the name Rudolstadt from his title and assumed the title Prince of Schwarzburg.

Following the outbreak of the German revolution Prince Günther abdicated on 22 November 1918. Following his death in Sondershausen in the spring of 1925, he was succeeded as head of the House of Schwarzburg by Prince Sizzo.

Marriage
Prince Günther was married to Princess Anna Louise of Schönburg-Waldenburg (1871–1951) at Rudolstadt on 9 December 1891. She was daughter of his uncle Prince Georg of Schönburg-Waldenburg (1828–1900) and Princess Luise of Bentheim-Tecklenburg (1844–1922). The marriage was childless.

In 1942 Princess Anna Luise adopted her nephew Prince Wilhelm of Schönburg-Waldenburg (1913–44) and his son Prince Ulrich (b. 1940).

Ancestry

References

External links
Painting of Prince Günther

|-

|-

1852 births
1925 deaths
People from Rudolstadt
German princes
House of Schwarzburg
People from Schwarzburg-Rudolstadt
People from Schwarzburg-Sondershausen
Monarchs who abdicated
Generals of Cavalry (Prussia)